The Tallahassee Symphony Orchestra is an American orchestra based in Tallahassee, Florida that was founded in 1979, with Nicholas Harsanyi as director. Harsanyi was a noted violist and a student of Béla Bartók, who later even played chamber music with Albert Einstein at Princeton University. After Nicholas Harsanyi's death, the baton was handed on to several guest conductors before being passed to David Hoose, who led the orchestra from 1993 to 2005. Miriam Burns directed the orchestra from 2006 until the current director, Darko Butorac, took over in July 2013.

The orchestra usually performs four formal concerts each year, in Ruby Diamond Auditorium at Florida State University, along with a special holiday concert, and a youth concert. Professors and graduate students from the Florida State University College of Music are often prominent among the performers.

External links
 Tallahassee Symphony Orchestra
 Florida State University College of Music

Musical groups established in 1979
Culture of Tallahassee, Florida
Orchestras based in Florida
Tourist attractions in Tallahassee, Florida